Brentwood Town Football Club is a football club based in Brentwood, Essex, England.

History
A Brentwood Football Club was established in the 19th century, and played in the FA Cup several times, reaching the quarter-finals in 1885–86, where they were beaten 3–1 by eventual winners Blackburn Rovers. They were also briefly members of Division One of the South Essex League for the 1896–97 season, but left after finishing bottom of the division. The club were later replaced as the town's main club by amateur club Brentwood & Warley. Brentwod & Warley joined Division One A of the South Essex League in 1921 and were runners-up in their first season in the league. They finished bottom of Division One in 1926–27, but were runners-up the following season, after which they joined Division One East of the Spartan League.

League reorganisation at the end of the 1928–29 season saw Brentwood & Warley placed in the Premier Division, where they remained until leaving the league at the end of the 1933–34 season. They rejoined the league in 1948, and were runners-up in 1948–49. In 1951 they were founder members of the Delphian League and were its inaugural champions. The club went on to win the league again in 1958–59 and 1959–60. In 1963 they joined Division Two of the Athenian League in 1963 after the Delphian League was disbanded.

In 1965 the club turned professional and became Brentwood Town. Playing at the Hive on Ongar Road, the renamed club left the amateur Athenian League to join the Metropolitan League. After two third-place finishes and a League Cup win in 1966–67, the club moved up to Division One of the Southern League in 1967. In 1968–69 they won Division One, and were promoted to the Premier Division. In the same season the club also reached the second round of the FA Cup, where they lost 10–1 at Southend United. The following season the club reached the third round of the cup; they beat Football League club Reading 1–0 in the first round, before defeating Hendon 2–0 in the second round. The third round saw them drawn at home against Northampton Town, with a record crowd of over 4,000 seeing the club lose 1–0. In the league the club briefly topped the table in September, and eventually finished ninth. However, at the end of the season the club directors decided to merge the club with Chelmsford City. The club's ground was sold for housing.

Modern club
After Brentwood Town were dissolved, Manor Athletic changed their name to Brentwood Athletic. Manor Athletic had been established in 1954, and joined the Essex Olympian League in 1967, winning the League Cup in their first season. In 1974 the club was renamed again, becoming simply Brentwood, and joined the Essex Senior League. They went on to win the League Cup in 1975–76, 1978–79, 1990–91

In 2000–01 the club won their first Essex Senior League title, although they finished third from bottom of the league the following season. In 2004 the club adopted its current name. After winning the Essex Senior League for the second time in 2006–07, and also winning the League Cup, the club was promoted to Division One North of the Isthmian League. In 2008–09 they finished third and qualified for the promotion play-offs, but lost 4–1 at home to Waltham Abbey. In 2010–11 the club finished fifth and qualified for the play-offs again. After defeating Needham Market 3–1 in the semi-finals, they lost 3–2 to Wingate & Finchley in the final. They qualified for the play-offs again after a fourth-place finish in 2014–15, and after beating AFC Sudbury on penalties in the semi-final, they defeated Thurrock 5–0 in the final to earn promotion to the Premier Division. However, the following season saw them finish in the relegation zone, resulting in relegation back to Division One North.

Ground
Manor Athletic played at King George's Playing Fields until moving to Larkin's Playing Field in 1957. In 1992 they were required to leave the ground in order to maintain senior status, and groundshared at East Thurrock United's Rookery Hill. The following year they moved to the Brentwood Centre, with the opening match played on 9 October 1993. Initially the only spectator facilities was a covered area adjacent to the clubhouse; seats were later installed in one half of the stand. Floodlights were installed in 1999. A new record attendance was set in August 2004 when a crowd of 472 watched a friendly match against a West Ham United XI.

Coaching staff

List of managers

Honours
Essex Senior League
Champions 2000–01, 2006–07
League Cup winners 1975–76, 1978–79, 1990–91, 2006–07
Gordon Brasted Memorial Trophy
Winners 2006–07
Harry Fisher Memorial Trophy
Winners 1995–96
Essex Olympian League
League Cup Winners 1967–68

Records
Best FA Cup performance: Third round, 1969–70
Best FA Trophy performance: First round, 1969–70
Best FA Vase performance: First round, 2004–05, 2006–07
Record attendance
Original club: 4,000 vs Northampton Town, FA Cup third round, 12 January 1970
Modern club: 897 vs Stowmarket Town, Isthmian League Division One North play-off semi-final, 26 April 2022

See also
Brentwood Town F.C. players
Brentwood Town F.C. managers

References

External links
Official website

 
Football clubs in England
Football clubs in Essex
Association football clubs established in 1954
1954 establishments in England
Southern Football League clubs
Metropolitan League
Essex Olympian Football League
Essex Senior Football League
Isthmian League
Brentwood (Essex town)
South Essex League